Nizhny Kachmash (Tübänge Qasmaş) is a rural locality (a village) in Nizhnekachmashevsky Selsoviet, Kaltasinsky District, Bashkortostan, Russia. The population was 471 as of 2010. There are 10 streets.

Geography 
Nizhny Kachmash is located 6 km west of Kaltasy (the district's administrative centre) by road. Kokush is the nearest rural locality.

References 

Rural localities in Kaltasinsky District